Edward Keith-Roach     (Born 1885 Gloucester, England - died 1954). Keith-Roach was the British Colonial administrator during the British mandate on Palestine, who also served as the governor of Jerusalem from 1926 to 1945 (excluding a period in the 1930s when he was governor of the Galilee). He was posted during a period of great political upheaval, Reuters labelling him ‘the Pasha of Jerusalem’.

References

Edward Keith-Roach is the author of a number of books about Palestine, and an Autobiography:
 (1922):  The Handbook of Palestine  Publisher: Macmillan Company, 1922 
 (1930):  The Handbook of Palestine and Trans-Jordan Publisher: Macmillan Company, 1930 
 (1994):  Pasha of Jerusalem: Memoirs of a District Commissioner Under the British mandate  Publisher: Palgrave Macmillan,

1885 births
1954 deaths
Commanders of the Order of the British Empire
Administrators of Palestine
History of Palestine (region)
Officers of the Order of the White Lion
People from Gloucester
British people in Mandatory Palestine